Phiale may refer to:

Phiale (spider), a genus of spiders of the family Salticidae (jumping spiders)
Phiale, an ancient Greek libation bowl; see patera
Phiale (Bithynia), a town of ancient Bithynia, now in Turkey
Phiale (building), an enclosed or arcaded fountain